Martin Zaagmolen or Martinus Saeghmolen (buried 1 November 1669) was a Dutch painter.

biography
Zaagmolen was born in Oldenburg.  Houbraken notices him as a painter of history, and describes a picture of the Last Judgment by him, in which were introduced a great number of figures, very poorly drawn and feebly coloured. Saeghmolen operated from 1640 to 1660. He was the master of Jan Luyken, and Michiel van Musscher; so, if he was not a good painter himself, he was a prestigious teacher.
For the anatomist Johannes Van Horne, he also created a massive myology atlas.

Zaagmolen died in Amsterdam.

Notes

References

Attribution

Further reading
 — About the discovery of 253 anatomical drawings by Martinus Saeghmolen. With scientific article to download.

1600s births
1669 deaths
Dutch Golden Age painters
Dutch male painters
People from Oldenburg (city)